The Burmese–Siamese War (1765–1767) (lit. "war of the second fall of Ayutthaya"), also known as the fall of Ayoudhia (အယုဒ္ဓယပျက်ခန်း) was the second military conflict between the Konbaung dynasty of Burma (Myanmar) and the Ban Phlu Luang dynasty of the Ayutthaya Kingdom of Siam, and the war that ended the 417-year-old Ayutthaya Kingdom. Nonetheless, the Burmese were soon forced to give up their hard-won gains when the Chinese invasions of their homeland forced a complete withdrawal by the end of 1767. A new Siamese dynasty, to which the current Thai monarchy traces its origins, emerged to reunify Siam by 1771.

This war was the continuation of the 1759–60 war. The casus belli of this war was also the control of the Tenasserim coast and its trade, and Siamese support for rebels in the Burmese border regions. The war began in August 1765 when a 20,000-strong northern Burmese army invaded northern Siam, and was joined by three southern armies of over 20,000 in October, in a pincer movement on Ayutthaya. By late-January 1766, the Burmese armies had overcome numerically superior but poorly coordinated Siamese defenses, and converged before the Siamese capital.

The siege of Ayutthaya began during the first Chinese invasion of Burma. The Siamese believed that if they could hold out until the rainy season, the seasonal flooding of the Siamese central plain would force a retreat. But King Hsinbyushin of Burma believed that the Chinese war was a minor border dispute, and continued the siege. During the rainy season of 1766 (June–October), the battle moved to the waters of the flooded plain but failed to change the status quo. When the dry season came, the Chinese launched a much larger invasion but Hsinbyushin still refused to recall the troops. In March 1767, King Ekkathat of Siam offered to become a tributary but the Burmese demanded unconditional surrender. On 7 April 1767, the Burmese sacked the starving city for the second time in its history, committing atrocities that have left a major black mark on Burmese-Thai relations to the present day. Thousands of Siamese captives were relocated to Burma.

The Burmese occupation was short-lived. In November 1767, the Chinese again invaded with their largest force yet, finally convincing Hsinbyushin to withdraw his forces from Siam. In the ensuing civil war in Siam, the Siamese state of Thonburi, led by Taksin, had emerged victorious, defeating all other breakaway Siamese states and eliminating all threats to his new rule by 1771. The Burmese, all the while, were preoccupied defeating a fourth Chinese invasion of Burma by December 1769.

By then, a new stalemate had taken hold. Burma had annexed the lower Tenasserim coast but again failed to eliminate Siam as the sponsor of rebellions in her eastern and southern borderlands. In the following years, Hsinbyushin was preoccupied by the Chinese threat, and did not renew the Siamese war until 1775—only after Lan Na had revolted again with Siamese support. The post-Ayutthaya Siamese leadership, in Thonburi and later Rattanakosin (Bangkok), proved more than capable; they defeated the next two Burmese invasions (1775–1776 and 1785–1786), and vassalized Lan Na in the process.

Background
The Burmese–Siamese War (1765–1767) was the continuation of the war of 1759–1760, the casus belli of which was a dispute over the control of the Tenasserim coast and its trade, and Siamese support for ethnic Mon rebels of the fallen restored Hanthawaddy Kingdom of Lower Burma. The 1760 war, which claimed the life of the dynasty founder King Alaungpaya, was inconclusive. Although Burma regained control of the upper Tenasserim coast to Tavoy, it achieved none of its other objectives. Following the war, the new Burmese king, Naungdawgyi, was beset with rebellions in Ava and Toungoo, and instabilities spread to the border regions. Lan Na (Chiang Mai) was in open rebellion (1761–1763) with active Siamese support. (Siam even sent an army in support of the rebels. However, the Siamese chronicles claim that the army did not engage in the fighting because the Burmese army had already defeated the rebellion.) In the Burmese south too, the Siamese readily provided shelter to the defeated ethnic Mon rebels who had unsuccessfully rebelled in 1762.

Things calmed down after the Lan Na rebellion was suppressed in January 1763. Naungdawgyi, who had been putting down multiple rebellions since his accession, was eager to lead a peaceful reign. He chose not to renew a war with Siam despite Siam's active support of the Lan Na rebellion and continued sheltering Mon rebels. Naundawgyi died in November 1763, and was succeeded by his brother Hsinbyushin who had wanted to continue the war with Siam since the end of the last war.

The Siamese leadership was alarmed by Hsinbyushin's accession. Knowing that another war was inevitable, the Siamese leadership accelerated their policy of keeping Burmese regions unstable. In mid-1764, the Siamese successfully encouraged the ethnic Mon governor of Tavoy, who had been appointed by Alaungpaya only four years earlier, to switch sides. Hsinbyushin was forced to send an army led by Maha Nawrahta, who retook Tavoy in November 1764. Likewise, instabilities resumed in Lan Na after the Burmese army left in February 1764, forcing the Burmese to return to the region later in the year.

By January 1765, Burmese armies were massed at Tavoy in the south and Chiang Mai in the north, preparing for imminent war.

Prelude to war

Burmese preparations
As the deputy commander-in-chief in the 1760 war, Hsinbyushin used his firsthand experience to plan the next invasion. His general plan called for a pincer movement on the Siamese capital from the north and the south. He appointed two of the country's most decorated soldiers, Maha Nawrahta and Ne Myo Thihapate, to lead the invasion.

On the southern front, an army of 20,000 men under the command of Maha Nawrahta and his 20,000 strong army was stationed in Tavoy. He had recently put down the Tavoy Rebellion. The control of Tavoy gave the Burmese access of the Myitta pass.

In the north, Ne Myo Thihapate was ordered to raise an army from the Shan States throughout 1764. By November, Ne Myo Thihapate commanded a 20,000-strong army at Kengtung, preparing to leave for Chiang Mai. As was customary, the Shan regiments were led by their own saophas (chiefs). (Not everyone was happy about the Burmese army's conscription drive, however. Some of the saophas of northern Shan states, which at the time paid dual tribute to Burma and China, fled to China, and complained to the Chinese emperor).

The next step in Hsinbyushin's plan was to outflank the Siamese in the north and northeast. Ne Myo Thihapate was ordered to acquire the Laotian states of Vientiane and Luang Phrabang. Vientiane was acquired without a fight in January 1765. Luang Phrabang put up a fight but was defeated in March 1765. The defeated Laotian states then were forced to provide levies to the northern army. The entire northern Burmese command now had over 20,000 men. On 29 April 1765, a northern invasion army of 20,000 was posted at Lampang at the Siamese border. (The rest were assigned to garrisons in Kengtung and Chiang Mai to guard the rear. The precaution proved prescient as the Kengtung garrison successfully resisted the Chinese invasion of 1765–1766).

While the main Burmese armies were massed at the Siamese border, a rebellion broke out in Manipur. Characteristically, Hsinbyushin did not recall the armies. Instead, he led an expeditionary force to put down the rebellion in December 1764. Having arrived back at Ava in April 1765, the Burmese king then sent 10,000 men to reinforce the southern army, which now numbered 30,000. The Burmese army now had mobilized 50,000 men. (This likely represented the largest mobilization of the Burmese army since Bayinnaung's 1568–1569 invasion.). The Burmese artillery corps were led by a group of about 200 French soldiers who were captured in the Battle of Syriam in 1756 during the Burmese civil war of 1752–1757.

Siamese preparations
The Siamese too had been busy planning their defenses since Hsinbyushin accession. Their defenses had been on alert since they got the Tavoy governor to revolt in mid-1764. King Ekkathat had already launched a massive mobilization drive across the entire country when Maha Nawrahta came down with his army and retook Tavoy in November 1764. In all, the Siamese southern defenses alone comprised over 60,000 troops. Ekkathat placed several of "his best legions" along the entire western arc from the Three Pagodas Pass to Kanchanaburi across Tavoy, to the Gulf of Siam in the extreme south to face off Maha Nawrahta. In the north, the main Siamese defensive line began at Sukhothai and Phitsanulok. The defenses farther north immediately facing the northern Burmese army relied on small forts built by local chiefs.

Finally, the Siamese relied on a heavily fortified Ayutthaya city, strategically sited at the estuary of two rivers where high rising waters in the rainy season had kept it safe against enemies over the centuries. The Siamese had used their wealth to acquire several thousand muskets and artillery. (When the Burmese finally captured Ayutthaya in 1767, they found over 10,000 new muskets and ammunition in the royal armory, still unused even after a 14-month siege.). As was the case in 1760, foreign mercenaries (including some Europeans and the Chinese) were hired for Ayutthaya's defense. At least one English ship was enlisted for her broadsides.

Burmese battle plan

The Burmese battle plan was greatly shaped by their experience in the 1759–1760 war. First, they would avoid a single pronged attack route along the narrow Gulf of Siam coastline, which they discovered, could easily be clogged up by more numerous Siamese forces. In 1760, the Burmese were forced to spend nearly three months (January–March) to fight their way out of the coastline. This time, they planned a multi-pronged attack from all sides to stretch out the numerically superior Siamese defenses.

Secondly, they would start the invasion early to maximize the dry-season campaign period. In the previous war, Alaungpaya started the invasion too late (in late December 1759/early January 1760). When the Burmese finally reached Ayutthaya in mid April, they only had a little over a month left before the rainy season to take the city. This time, they elected to begin the invasion at the height of the rainy season. By starting the invasion early, the Burmese hoped, their armies would be within a striking distance from Ayutthaya at the beginning of the dry season.

First wet season offensive (August 1765 – November 1765)

Northern front (August 1765)
The invasion began on 23 August 1765 (8th waxing of Tawthalin 1127 ME) at the height of the rainy season when the 20,000 strong northern Burmese army (20 regiments and three hundred war-boats) invaded Siam down the Wang River. The southern armies stayed put. The reason for the earlier start of the northern army was that it was much farther away from Ayutthaya than its southern counterparts. Still the strategy did not work as planned. The northern army's advance was greatly slowed by the rainy weather and the "petty chiefs" who put up a fight, forcing Thihapate to storm town after town. Nonetheless, Thihapate fought his way down the Wang, finally taking Tak and Kamphaeng Phet by the end of the rainy season.

Southern front (October 1765)
Meanwhile, Maha Nawrahta opened the southern front on 23 October 1765 (10th waxing of Tazaungmon 1127 ME) in three directions. He had 20,000 to 30,000 under his command. (The Burmese sources say 30,000 men including 2000 horses and 200 elephants but G E Harvey gives the actual invasion force as 20,000. At least part of the difference could be explained by the rearguard who stayed behind to defend the Tenasserim coast). A small army invaded by the Three Pagodas Pass towards Suphan Buri. Another small army invaded down the Tenasserim coast towards Mergui (Myeik) and Tenasserim (Tanintharyi) town. However, the main thrust of his attack was at Kanchanaburi. His 20,000-strong main southern army invaded via the Myitta Pass. (It was also the same route the Japanese used in 1942 to invade Burma from Thailand.) Kanchanaburi fell with little resistance.

The main reason for the quick fall of Kanchanaburi could be that the Burmese were battle-hardened. But it could also be that the Siamese command miscalculated where the Burmese main attack would come from, and had not sufficiently reinforced the fort to withstand a major attack. Judging by the Siamese chronicles' reporting of the main attack route, the Siamese command appeared to have believed that the main Burmese attack would come from the Gulf of Siam coastline, instead of the most obvious and shortest route via Kanchanaburi. The Siamese sources say that Maha Nawrahta's main invasion route came from southern Tenasserim, crossing the Tenasserim range at Chumphon and Phetchaburi. The path is totally different from the Kanchanaburi route reported by the Burmese chronicles. Historian Kyaw Thet specifically adds that the main attack route was via the Myitta Pass.
The Chumphon route is unlikely to have been the main attack route as it was even farther south than Alaungpaya's Kui Buri route. It means the Burmese would have had a longer route to go back up the Gulf of Siam coast. Without the element of surprise that Alaungpaya enjoyed in the 1760 war, the Burmese invasion force of 1765 would have had to fight more than three months it took Alaungpaya to break away from the coast. Yet, Maha Nawrahta's army was west of Ayutthaya by December. To be sure, the smaller Burmese army that took Tenasserim could have crossed over at Chumphon, and marched up the coast although the most southerly battles reported by the Burmese were at Ratchaburi and Phetchaburi, on the northern coast. At any rate, according to the Burmese sources, Chumphon was not the main attack route.

First dry season offensive (November 1765 – January 1766)

Battle of Nonthaburi (November–December 1765)
After Kanchanaburi, Maha Nawrahta's southern army marched on towards south of Ayutthaya, and faced token opposition until they reached Nonthaburi about 60 km south of Ayutthaya. There, they finally faced a serious Siamese defensive line guarding the route to the capital, and Maha Nawrahta set up a garrison. The first major battle of the southern theatre ensued when the Siamese made a joint land-naval attack on the Burmese garrison. The naval force consisted of several war boats and a British ship which was used to bombard Burmese positions. But the Burmese defenses held, and the Siamese retreated. The British ship fled to the sea.

The Burmese army then marched north and was met by a Siamese force of 60,000 near west of the city. Outnumbered 3 to 1, the more experienced Burmese army nonetheless routed the much larger Siamese army, which according to the Burmese, was "chopped to pieces", forcing the remaining Siamese troops to retreat to the capital. Maha Nawrahta had now arrived at Ayutthaya as planned, in record time. ("It took Alaungpaya's 40,000 men about three and a half months to arrive at Ayutthaya in 1760 whereas it took Maha Nawrahta's 20,000 plus army just about two months"). But he pulled back to the northwest of the city because he did not see Thihapate's northern army, and because he did not want to take on another major battle with his depleted army. He fixed his headquarters near the Pagoda built by Bayinnaung two centuries before. He used the hiatus to refill the ranks with Siamese conscripts.

Northern operations (November 1765 – January 1766)
Meanwhile, Ne Myo Thihapate's northern army was still stuck in northern Siam although the pace of his advance had improved considerably since the end of the rainy season. After taking Kamphaeng Phet, Thihapate turned northeast, and captured the main northern cities of Sukhothai and Phitsanulok. At Phitsanulok, he paused to refill the ranks because in about 4 months, he had already lost many men to the grueling campaign and to "preventable diseases". The local chiefs were made to drink the water of allegiance and provide conscripts to the Burmese army. (Outside Ayutthaya, Maha Nawrahta too was collecting local levies.)

While the Burmese refilled their ranks, the Siamese command belatedly sent another army to retake Phitsanulok. But the Siamese army was driven back with heavy losses. It was the last major stand by the Siamese in the north. The Siamese defense collapsed afterwards. The Burmese army then moved by boat down the Nan River, taking Phichai, Phichit, Nakhon Sawan, and down the Chao Phraya, taking Ang Thong. They reached the environs of Ayutthaya on 20 January 1766, making contact with Maha Nawrahta's army.

Battle of Bang Rachan
According to Thai tradition, Ne Myo Thihapate's northern army was held up for five months at Bang Rachan, a small village northwest of Ayutthaya by a group of simple villagers. But the Burmese chronicles say that they only faced token opposition between Phitsanulok and Ayutthaya.

Not all the points of this traditional Thai story can be true as the entire northern campaign took just under five months (23 August 1765 to 20 January 1766). The Burmese chronicles do speak of "petty chiefs" stalling the northern army's advance but it was early in the campaign along the Wang river during the rainy season (August–October). The Burmese general who was actually stationed near Ayutthaya was not Thihapate but rather Maha Nawrahta, whose southern army waited for about a month for the northern army to show up. It appears that the three verified events—petty chiefs resisting Thihapate in the north, Thihapate's campaign period of five months, and Maha Nawrahta staking out by Ayutthaya—have merged to create this popular mythology.

First Chinese invasion of Burma (December 1765 – April 1766)
In the meantime, an ominous situation had developed in the north for the Burmese. In response to Ne Myo Thihapate's recruitment campaign in the northern Shan states, which the Chinese considered their territory, the Qianlong Emperor ordered an invasion of Sipsongpanna and Kengtung. In December 1765, as the Burmese waged the Battles of Phitsanulok and Ayutthaya, a Chinese invasion force of 3,500 invaded, laying siege to the Burmese garrison at Kengtung. Though battle-hardened Burmese forces eventually drove back the besiegers, Burma was now fighting on two fronts, one of which had the largest army in the world.

Nonetheless, Hsinbyushin apparently (as it turned out, mistakenly) believed that the border conflict could be contained as a low-grade war. He refused to recall his armies in Siam though he did reinforce Burmese garrisons along the Chinese border—in Kengtung, Kenghung and Kaungton.

Siege of Ayutthaya (January 1766 – April 1767)

Battle at the outskirts (January 1766)
While the Burmese garrison was battling the Chinese at Kengtung, the combined Burmese armies outside Ayutthaya were as strong as ever. Swelled by the Siamese levies, the combined Burmese invasion force now had 50,000 men, surpassing their pre-invasion strength of 20,000–30,000 men. The Siamese Army, which also gathered up 50,000 men, attempted a last-ditch effort to prevent a siege of the city. In late January, the Siamese forces came out and attacked Burmese positions centered around the Bayinnaung pagoda. Maha Nawrahta's army was on the west side of the pagoda and Thihapate's was on the east. The initial Siamese attacks focused on the west wing, gradually driving back Maha Nawrahta's army. But Thihapate's army outflanked the Siamese lines from the east, and succeeded in cutting the Siamese army in two. The Siamese vanguard which was pushing Maha Nawrahta's line was completely encircled. The ensuing battle wiped out much of the several thousand strong vanguard, and the rest were taken prisoner. The remaining Siamese troops retreated into the city and shut the gates.

Early siege (February 1766 – May 1766)
The Siamese command had made careful preparations to defend the capital. The fortifications consisted of a high brick wall with a broad wet ditch. The walls were mounted with numerous guns and cannon that they had stockpiled since the last Burmese war. Finally, they had banked on the advent of the rainy season, which had more than once saved the city in the past. They believed that if they could only hold out until the onset of the monsoon rains and the flooding of the great Central Plain, the Burmese would be forced to retreat.

Realizing that they had less than four months before the rainy season, the Burmese command initially launched a few assaults on the city walls. But the place proved too strong and too well-defended. Because of the numerous stockades outside the city, the Burmese could not even get near the wall, and those that got near were cut down by musket fire from atop. The Burmese now drew a line of entrenchments round the city, and prepared to reduce it by famine. As time passed and no signs of surrender appeared, the approach of the dreaded rainy season caused alarm among the Burmese command. Several senior commanders advised calling off the invasion. However, Maha Nawrahta decided to continue the invasion, and his colleague Thihapate supported him. The Burmese command now made preparations to meet the rise of the river by collecting boats and building embankments on the bits of high ground.

Second rainy season offensive (June 1766 – October 1766)

When the rains came, the Burmese line of entrenchment round the city was swallowed up by the rising river. The Burmese were now broken up into several corps clinging on to artificial islands around the city. Seeing that the enemy was scattered into isolated camps, the Siamese attacked them in boats. The Burmese also had plenty of boats and met the Siamese boats in kind. In one of the naval battles, a Siamese commander while waving his sword and hurling defiance in the bows of his boat, was brought down by a musket shot, and the whole flotilla fled. In another encounter, one Siamese cannon shot scored a direct hit, killing several men on two Burmese boats.

At any rate, the Siamese attempts to break the siege were unsuccessful. During this time, the Burmese troops farther back grew their own rice while their boats prevented supplies from entering the city. By the end of the monsoon season, the city was beginning to run low on provisions.

Second dry season offensive (November 1766 – March 1767)
When the waters subsided, the Burmese reconstructed the earthworks around the city, and gained more complete command than before. Some of the earthworks were higher than the walls, with cannon firing down on the city and the palace itself. Towards the end of 1766, the governors of Tak and Phetchaburi led a waterborne expedition to relieve the city but were driven back. The governor of Phetchaburi was killed. The governor of Tak, Taksin, an able and ambitious commander, was blamed for the failed expedition, and hindered in his attempts to mount an effective counterattack. By then, the city was starving. To make matters worse, a fire broke out within the city in early 1767 that burned 10,000 houses.

All was not well for the invaders either. In December 1766, the Chinese launched their second invasion of Burma, directly aimed at Ava. Hsinbyushin, who had expected another Chinese invasion like the first one and had made preparations accordingly, was surprised by the sudden increase in the Chinese invasion force (25,000 versus 6,000 in the first invasion). Still, the fiery king was unwilling to recall the armies from Siam; instead he directed his remaining troops in northern Shan states to the Chinese front. He did however send a directive (dated 9 January 1767) to his commanders in Siam to take the city quickly, and return as they were needed to defend the homeland. Indeed, when it appeared that the Chinese situation was contained, he later sent another directive to the Siamese front to "persevere" in the siege.

Meanwhile, the Siamese leadership had grown desperate. The king and princes tried to escape the city but were driven back. The king finally offered to become a Burmese tributary but the Burmese, who had just received the king's order to persevere, would not accept anything less than an unconditional surrender. Shortly after, Maha Nawrahta died of illness, and by royal decree was buried with extraordinary honors. Ne Myo Thihapate now assumed the role of sole commander-in-chief.

Fall of Ayutthaya (April 1767)

By late March, the Burmese had dug tunnels to the walls, and mined them. At 4 pm on 7 April, several sections of the wall were brought down by the mines underneath, and the Burmese troops supported by artillery fire stormed the walls. (Harvey reports the date as 28 March but the Konbaung Hset Chronicle gives Tuesday, 5th waxing of Tabaung 1125 ME, which is 7 April.) The attackers finally breached the walls by sunset, and entered the city. The Siamese fought on inside the city but were eventually overwhelmed. Indiscriminate slaughter followed. Everything in sight was put to the torch. Even images of the Buddha were hacked for the gold with which they were coated.

30,000 Ayutthayan captives were forcibly relocated to the Burmese capital in Ava. The Burmese brought Uthumphon and hundreds of Siamese nobles and members of the royal family to be resettled in Burma. Virtually nothing was left of the 14th-century Grand Palace, home to 33 kings of five dynasties, or the glittering Sanphet Prasat, used to welcome foreign envoys and state visitors. The Siamese king was found dead, identified by his brother Uthumphon. The city of Ayutthaya, with a population said to rival contemporary London or Paris, was reduced to ashes by the "seemingly unstoppable Burmese military machine."

The centuries-old Ayutthaya Kingdom had come to an end. Siam was forcibly plunged into anarchy and civil war with the disappearance of a central authority.

Epilogue

Third Chinese invasion and Burmese withdrawal

For Hsinbyushin, his obsession to defeat Siam had come true. He now controlled a fragile empire that stretched from Manipur to Laos and Siam, which approximated Bayinnaung's 16th century empire. However, he now faced a far more difficult task of holding it together, all the while waging a war against China. He had planned to leave behind a substantial garrison at Ayutthaya, either placing a protected Siamese prince on the throne or appointing senior Burmese officials to rule the country directly. But because he had to allow Shan, Laotian and Siamese levies, some of whom had been away from home for nearly two years, to return home, Hsinbyushin had a limited number of forces available to him in the second half of 1767.

Still, the recalcitrant Burmese king tried to hold on to all his gains. To reinforce the Chinese front, he recalled from Siam a major portion of the army, which arrived back to Ava with the Siamese captives in July 1767. As it turned out, the remaining Burmese forces in Siam, which could not have been more than 10,000 at most, were too scattered among many garrisons, and too small to hold the conquered kingdom together. Indeed, the Burmese had little control outside their garrisons, and no control over the Siamese countryside where gangs of bandits roamed.

As it soon proved, Hsinbyushin's two-front policy was utterly unsustainable, and would nearly cost Burmese sovereignty. With the majority of Shan levies not available, the entire Burmese defenses only had about 20,000 men at the start of the third Chinese invasion in November 1767. Hsinbyushin apparently thought the size of his defenses was adequate for a similar size Chinese force of the second invasion. But the next Chinese invasion proved to be the largest yet—50,000 strong, and caught the Burmese command by surprise. The Chinese, led by their elite Manchu Bannermen, quickly overran outnumbered Burmese defenses and barreled down towards Ava, and by December, Hsinbyushin was finally forced to recall all his remaining troops from Siam. He sent them directly to the front in Shan states where the Burmese were conducting a guerrilla warfare against Chinese supply lines. Hsinbyushin was down to the last 12,000 men to defend his capital.) Bolstered by the returning troops from Siam, the Burmese defenses recovered. The Chinese forces were driven back with heavy losses in March 1768.

After the close-call, Hsinbyushin kept almost all his troops on the Chinese front. Better prepared, the Burmese forces defeated the next Chinese invasion at the end of 1769 at the border. Commanders from both sides signed an uneasy truce, which was not accepted by either government. The Chinese kept a heavy military lineup in the border areas of Yunnan for about a decade in an attempt to wage another war while imposing a ban on inter-border trade for twenty years. In the following years, Hsinbyushin was forced to keep his defenses strong along the Chinese border and could not renew his Siamese adventures.

In the meantime, much of the Burmese gains of 1765–1767 in Siam had gone to waste. An energetic leader had emerged to reunify Siam, and make her a formidable power in the following decades.

Siamese civil war and emergence of Taksin (1767–1771)

After the fall of Ayutthaya, the Burmese had little control over the Siamese countryside. After the Burmese left, five Siamese polities—Phitsanulok, Sawankhalok, Nakhon Si Thammarat, Phimai, and Chanthaburi (later Thonburi)—vied to fill the power vacuum.

Of the five, Taksin, based in Chanthaburi since June 1767, was to reunify Siam in the next three years. He emerged the main contender by late 1768.

According to Thai history, Taksin defeated a "sizable" Burmese force at Ayutthaya garrison in November 1767. The Burmese chronicles do not report this although they usually report any battle of significance even if they tend to downplay those with an unfavorable outcome. For example, the Burmese chronicles mention the 1774 Lan Na rebellion despite the outcome. If the battle truly was in Ayutthaya and in November, the chronicles should have mentioned it. To be sure, the lack of corroborating Burmese sources does not mean the battle did not take place. After all, the Burmese chronicles do not mention the looting of Ayutthaya either. Still, other contemporary events indicate that storming a fortified garrison was no easy task. The Chinese army could not take the Burmese garrison at Kengtung in 1765–1766. The Burmese themselves spent 14 months outside Ayutthaya. Taksin could not take Phitsanulok in May 1768.

At any rate, the sheer difference in reporting indicates a need for further verification of the event, which is taught in Thai schoolbooks as fact. In general, much of the reporting of the war, which still includes two different dates (28 March 1767 and 7 April 1767) for the sack of Ayutthaya—arguably the important date of the war, requires more detailed studies that consult both sides, without the nationalist bravado from either.

Taksin's first attempt at reunification—an expedition to Phitsanulok in May 1768—was unsuccessful. He captured Phimai at the end of 1768. By late 1769, he had defeated Nakhon Si Thammarat. In mid-1770, he finally defeated Phitsanulok, and became the sole ruler of Siam. It would take until 1771 with Taksin's capture of Hà Tiên (Banteay Mas) that saw him successfully eliminate all immediate threats to his rule over Siam.

Territorial changes
For all the fighting and destruction, the Burmese gained only the lower Tenasserim coast. It is likely that even the retention of Tenasserim was possible only because the Siamese were immersed in their civil war. A more united Siam would have likely retaken at least the lower Tenasserim coast, if not the upper coast since almost all Burmese troops were deployed on the Chinese front throughout 1768 and 1769. (Recall that Ekkathat, widely considered to be an ineffective ruler, was able to retake the lower coast in 1761 while Naungdawgyi had his hands full with multiple rebellions. A much more able leader like Taksin would certainly have retaken Tenasserim if it were not for the civil war.) But the Sino-Burmese war ended in December 1769, about six months before Taksin finished reunifying mainland Siam. Taksin chose not yet to renew the war with the Burmese over Tenasserim, instead chose to focus on consolidating his gains in mainland Siam, including conquering Lan Na to prevent a Burmese invasion into the Siamese heartland from the mountainous North (The Siamese would not launch an offensive invasion of Tenasserim until 1787).

Geopolitical situation to the next war (1768–1776)

Aside from acquiring the lower Tenasserim coast, the Burmese did not achieve their larger objectives of taming Siam and securing their peripheral regions. The actual outcome was the opposite. The new energetic Siamese leadership was now better able to support rebellions in Lan Na and Lower Burma. On the other hand, the Burmese offensive military capability was greatly diminished after two long wars with Siam and China. In the following years, Hsinbyushin was totally preoccupied with yet another Chinese invasion.

At any rate, the Burmese could blame the Siamese for fomenting the rebellions of the 1770s. It was mainly the warlord behavior of Burmese commanders who "were drunk with victory" that incited the rebellions. The Siamese were only helping the ready situation on the ground. In 1773, the southern Burmese army command provoked a mutiny by its ethnic Mon troops and put down the mutiny with "undue severity". Over 3,000 Mon troops and their families fled to Siam, and joined the Siamese army. The army command warlord's behavior only grew in 1774 when Hsinbyushin suffered from a debilitating long illness that would ultimately claim his life two years later. Local governors began to disregard the king's royal orders, an unimaginable development only a few years previously.

In January 1775, another Lan Na rebellion started with full Siamese support. Chiang Mai fell on 15 January 1775. Hsinbyushin on his deathbed ordered his last invasion of Siam in 1775. The Siamese defenses held this time. The Burmese armies were bogged down in central Siam in June 1776 when they withdrew after the news of Hsinbyushin's death had reached the front. Lan Na was firmly on the Siamese camp. The over two centuries Burmese rule of Lan Na had come to an end.

Analysis
The war came near the peak of Konbaung military power. (Their victory over the Chinese is considered the peak). According to Lieberman, the "near simultaneous victories over Siam (1767) and China (1765–1769) testified to a truly astonishing elan unmatched since Bayinnaung." To be sure, it was not so much that the Burmese had more troops or superior weapons; they did not. The main reason for Burmese victory was the same as that in the 1760 war: the Burmese, who had been in successive wars since 1740, simply had experienced, proven, confident commanders, while most Siamese commanders had little battlefield experience except in the 1760 war.

It was the Burmese commanders' ability to lead a multi-ethnic army which consisted of regiments from various parts of the empire that made the invasion even possible. (Upper Burma, the home of Konbaung dynasty, alone could not have launched an offensive war against a more populous Siam without its policy of having the conquered lands contribute to its next war effort). In this war, the Burmese command was able to inspire (or push) their troops. Historian Harvey writes: "When roused, the men fought with spirit, vying among themselves as to who should first mount the wall" although he wonders why: "They died like flies from preventable disease, and suffered ghastly wounds for which they received no thanks from the King, as the loss of a limb, even in honorable service, disqualified a man from entering the palace: His Majesty's sight must not be sullied by reality." Equally important, the Burmese commanders were able to motivate their Siamese levies, which by the battle of Ayutthaya made up a significant minority of the Burmese army. The Siamese participation in the Burmese army highlights the fact that the war was between the rulers, not between nations.

On the other hand, despite having made extensive preparations, when actual war came, Siamese commanders proved listless and uncoordinated. In all, they appeared to have relied much on the defenses of Ayutthaya, perhaps thinking that the Burmese would not be able to lay siege beyond the dry season. According to the Burmese chronicles, the southern Burmese army faced an easier time than in 1760. (They faced token opposition until it reached Nonthaburi, dangerously close to Ayutthaya. In contrast, the Siamese put up several spirited defensive stands in 1760, greatly slowing down the Burmese advance).

The Burmese would not make any progress against a better-led Siam, now based in Bangkok, in the future. This was the last war in which the Burmese were able to get near Ayutthaya, and achieve territorial gains. Burmese prowess progressively worsened over the next decades, and lost territory. They managed to penetrate to central Siam in 1775–1776, but were decisively defeated at the border in 1785–1786, after which the Burmese would no longer attempt another full-scale invasion.

Significance and legacy

A resurgent Siam
Perhaps the most important legacy of the war was the reemergence of Siam as a major military power in mainland Southeast Asia. The war replaced the ancien régime of Ayutthaya and brought in a new energetic dynasty. In the following years, the new Siamese leadership would go on to challenge the Burmese in Tenasserim, Laotian states, Lan Na and Kengtung, and redress Siam's "historical military inferiority to Burma". A resurgent Siam assembled a defensive empire, swallowing Burmese vassals/tributaries in Lan Na, the Lao states, and parts of the Shan States by the turn of the 19th century.

By the early 19th century, Siam, under the Rattanakosin dynasty, was one of three main powers in mainland Southeast Asia, along with Burma and Vietnam, and had the second largest empire in all of Southeast Asia after the Konbaung dynasty. After the First Anglo-Burmese War of 1824–1826 removed the Burmese threat to Siam, the Siamese empire expanded eastwards, mass repopulating the Isan Plateau with Lao captives and annexing western Cambodia, culminating with Vietnamese recognition of the Siamese puppet King of Cambodia in 1846, at the onset of British and French colonial involvement in Southeast Asia ending the 80-year period of Siamese imperial expansion (1770-1850), as well as increasing manpower problems due to Siamese fleeing to the rice frontier with the introduction of market capitalism into the region by China and later Europe in the 18th and 19th centuries.

Creation of Siamese/Thai proto-nationalism
Prior to the destruction of the Siamese state in 1767, Siamese monarchs rarely used the idea of the king being the "defender of religion, people [sic], and god." However, after 1767, the Thonburi and Bangkok dynasties took and wholeheartedly promoted elite proto-nationalism in order to defend Siamese Buddhism and Siamese Kingdom in times of future existential threats similar to 1767. The next subsequent Siamese monarchs Taksin, Rama I, and Rama II all emphasized the idea of proto-nationalism by emphasizing the ambition to protect the kingdom and Buddhism, issuing strict capital punishments for phrai who refused to fight to defend the "Lord Buddha", and creating maps of Burmese invasion routes and translating Burmese chronicles into Thai. This form of proto-nationalism would play a significant role in transforming a proto-national, royalist, narrative into a national narrative by Westernizing monarchs Rama V, Rama VI, and Rama VII, and by the post-1932 Khana Ratsadon (People's Party) government in successfully fabricating a Siamese, later Thai, national identity in response to 19th-century European colonialism. 

In comparison to Burma, in the First Anglo-Burmese War of 1824-26, sixty years after the fall of Ayutthaya, the historian Michael Woundy wrote that, "The Burmese may have stood a chance had they sensed that the British posed a threat to the very existence of their nation."

Impact on Thai-Burmese relations

The legacy of the war has lingered on negatively on the Burmese–Thai relations ever since.

Thai views
The fall of Ayutthaya is considered one of Thailand's greatest national calamities. A Siamese chronicler wrote: "The king of Hanthawaddy (Bayinnaung) waged war like a monarch but the king of Ava (Hsinbyushin) like a robber." In 1917, Siamese prince Damrong Rajanubhab published a highly nationalist history of the centuries long hostility between the two countries, Our Wars with the Burmese (Thai Rop Pharma), which had a major influence on the development of Thailand's view of its national history, as found in school text books and popular culture. In his view, not only were the Burmese a savage and aggressive people but Siam was defeated in war only when it was unprepared and divided against itself. Kings who rallied the people, such as Naresuan and Rama I, waged successful wars of national liberation against an imperialist enemy. Thus ancient battles between rival rulers suddenly became wars between nations.

More recent scholarship has cautioned against casting the history of the 16th and 18th centuries in a 20th-century conceptual framework. Historian Donald Seekins writes that "the 24 Thai–Burmese wars described by Damrong were wars between Monarchs rather than between nations", and that "many prominent Siamese of the era, including Naresuan's father, were willing to accept Burmese overlordship". Another historian Helen James writes that "these wars were primarily struggles for regional and dynastic supremacy and were neither national nor ethnic conflicts." After all, many Siamese levies participated in the attack on Ayutthaya. This view is echoed by modern Thai academics such as Nidhi Eoseewong and Sunait Chutintaranond. According to Sunait "The negative attitude toward the Burmese does not occur solely as a result of the past relationship. It is, rather, the outcome of political manoeuvres by the Thai nationalist governments, especially military regimes."

Nonetheless, the modern academic viewpoints have not replaced Damrong's viewpoints in Thai schoolbooks, or popular culture. This has fostered a feeling of enmity among the Thai people towards the Burmese, and has colored the Thai-Burmese relations to the present day with real political ramifications. This enmity at least in the Thai political leadership manifested in the Thai "buffer zone" policy, which has provided shelter, at various times and has actively encouraged and "sponsored", the several ethnic resistance groups along the border.

Burmese views
In December 1954, U Nu, the first prime minister of the Union of Burma, on his first state visit to Bangkok, publicly apologized for Burma's past misdeeds. However, most Burmese today only know superficially about their past kings' invasions. Most know little about the destruction and atrocities committed by the Burmese troops in Siam because Burmese school books simply do not mention them. Many Burmese fail to realize some of the historical reasons behind the Thai enmity, and the Thai governments' buffer zone policy. Many Burmese, especially those in the military, remain skeptical of the Thai governments' assurances that it would not tolerate any activities that "undermine stability of neighboring countries".

Siamese influence on Burmese culture
The Siamese captives carried off from Ayutthaya went on to have an outsize influence on traditional Burmese theatre and dance. In 1789, a Burmese royal commission consisting of Princes and Ministers was charged with translating Siamese and Javanese dramas from Thai to Burmese. With the help of Siamese artists captured from Ayutthaya in 1767, the commission adapted two important epics from Thai to Burmese: the Siamese Ramayana and the Enao, the Siamese version of Javanese Panji tales into Burmese Yama Zattaw and Enaung Zattaw. One style of classical Burmese dance, Yodaya Aka (lit. Ayutthayan dance) is considered one of the most delicate of all traditional Burmese dances. Yodaya songs also form a genre of the Mahāgīta, the Burmese canon of classical songs.

In popular culture
The 2018 Thai soap opera Nueng Dao Fa Diao and Sai Lohit depicts the Burmese–Siamese War (1765–1767).

See also
 Burmese–Siamese wars
 Burma–Thailand relations
 Sino-Burmese War (1765–1769)

Notes

References
 
 
 
 
 
 
 
 
 
 
 
 
 
 
 
 
 
 
 
 
 
 
 

Burmese–Siamese wars
Wars involving the Ayutthaya Kingdom
18th century in the Ayutthaya Kingdom
18th century in Burma
1760s in Asia
Conflicts in 1765
Conflicts in 1766
Conflicts in 1767
1700s in Asia
1765 in Asia
1766 in Asia
1767 in Asia
1760s in the Ayutthaya Kingdom
1765 in the Ayutthaya Kingdom
1766 in the Ayutthaya Kingdom
1767 in the Ayutthaya Kingdom
1760s in Burma
1765 in Burma